is a Japanese politician of the New Komeito Party, a member of the House of Representatives in the Diet (national legislature). A native of Himeji, Hyōgo and graduate of Keio University, he was elected to the House of Representatives for the first time in 1993 after an unsuccessful run in 1990.

References

External links 
  in Japanese.

Members of the House of Representatives (Japan)
Keio University alumni
Living people
1945 births
People from Himeji, Hyōgo
New Komeito politicians
21st-century Japanese politicians